The Tenant  (French: Le locataire) is a 1976 French psychological horror thriller film directed by Roman Polanski. The film stars Polanski, Isabelle Adjani, Melvyn Douglas, and Shelley Winters. It is based upon the 1964 novel Le locataire chimérique by Roland Topor and is the last film in Polanski's "Apartment Trilogy", following Repulsion and Rosemary's Baby. The film was entered into the 1976 Cannes Film Festival and had a total of 534,637 admissions in France.

Plot
Trelkovsky, a quiet and unassuming man, rents an apartment in Paris whose previous tenant, Egyptologist Simone Choule, attempted to commit suicide by throwing herself out of the window and through a pane of glass below at 39 Rue de Calais. Before moving in officially, he meets the concierge, who shows the apartment to him, and also shows him where Simone fell. Nobody has any idea why she was suicidal. Trelkovsky visits Simone in the hospital but finds her entirely in bandages and unable to talk. Whilst still at Simone's bedside, Trelkovsky meets her friend, Stella, who has also come to visit. Stella is overwhelmed with emotion and begins talking to Simone, who looks towards her visitors and screams monstrously. The matron insists they leave, having already informed Trelkovsky that he may not speak to Choule. Trelkovsky tries to comfort Stella but dares not say that he never knew Simone, instead pretending to be another friend. They leave together and go out for a drink and a movie (1973's Enter The Dragon), where Stella fondles him. Outside the theatre they part ways. Later, Trelkovsky calls up the hospital to enquire about Simone, and is told she has died.

As Trelkovsky occupies the apartment he is chastised repeatedly by his neighbors and landlord, Monsieur Zy, for hosting a party with his friends, apparently having a woman over, making too much noise in general, and not joining in on a petition against another neighbor. Trelkovsky attempts to adapt to his situation, but is increasingly disturbed by the apartment and the other tenants. He frequently sees his neighbors standing motionless in the toilet room (which he can see from his own window), and discovers a hole in the wall with a human tooth stashed inside. He discusses this with his friends, who do not find things strange and belittle him for not standing up to his neighbours. He visits the apartment of one of his work friends, who plays a marching band record at a spitefully loud volume. A neighbour politely asks him to turn down the music, as his wife is ill and trying to sleep. Trelkovsky turns the record down, but his friend tells the neighbour that he will play his music as he wants, and that he does not care about his sick wife.

He receives a visit from one Georges Badar, who secretly loved Simone and has believed her to be alive and well. Trelkovsky updates and comforts the man and spends the night out with him. He receives a postcard that Badar had posted before realising Simone had died. Frequenting the nearby café which Simone also patronised, he is recognized as the new tenant of her apartment. The owner pressures him into having Simone's regular order, which is then always given to him without being ordered, against his preferences. They are always out of his preferred choice of cigarette, Gauloises, so he develops a habit of ordering Marlboros, which Simone used to order.

Trelkovsky becomes severely agitated and enraged when his apartment is robbed, while his neighbors and the concierge continue to berate him for making too much noise, and his landlord warns him not to inform the police of the burglary. Suffering from fever and bad dreams, he wakes up one morning to find his face made up. He buys a wig and women's shoes and goes on to dress up (using Simone's dress which he had found in a cupboard) and sit still in his apartment in the dead of night. He suspects that Zy and the neighbors are trying to subtly change him into the last tenant, Simone, so that he too will kill himself. He becomes hostile and paranoid in his day-to-day environment (snapping at his friends, slapping a child in a park) and his mental state progressively deteriorates. He has visions of his neighbors playing football with a human head, finding the toilet covered in hieroglyphs, and looking across the courtyard, seeing himself standing at his apartment window, looking into the bathroom with binoculars. Trelkovsky runs off to Stella for comfort and sleeps over, but in the morning after she has left for work, he concludes that she too is in on his neighbors' plot, and proceeds to vandalise and burgle her apartment before departing.

At night he is hit by an elderly couple driving a car. He is not injured too seriously, but receives a sedative injection from the doctor due to his odd behavior – he perceives the elderly couple as his landlord Zy and wife, and accuses them of trying to murder him. The couple returns him to his apartment. A deranged Trelkovsky dresses up again as a woman and throws himself out of the apartment window in the manner of Simone Choule, before what he believes to be a clapping, cheering audience composed of his neighbors. The suicide attempt wakes up his neighbors, who call the police and attempt to restrain him. He crawls away from them back to his apartment, and jumps out the window a second time moments after the police arrive.

In the final scene, Trelkovsky is bandaged up in the same fashion as Simone Choule, in the same hospital bed. From his perspective, his and Stella's visit to Simone is shown. Trelkovsky then lets out a monstrous scream as Simone did in the earlier scene.

Cast

 Roman Polanski – Trelkovsky
 Isabelle Adjani – Stella
 Melvyn Douglas – Monsieur Zy
 Jo Van Fleet – Madame Dioz
 Bernard Fresson – Scope
 Rufus – Georges Badar
 Shelley Winters – The Concierge
 Lila Kedrova – Madame Gaderian
 Patrice Alexsandre – Robert
 Romain Bouteille – Simon
 Josiane Balasko – Viviane
 Claude Dauphin – Husband at the accident
 Claude Piéplu – Neighbor (as Claude Pieplu)
 Jacques Monod – Cafe Owner
 Jean-Pierre Bagot – Policeman
 Jacques Rosny – Jean-Claude
 Michel Blanc – Scope's Neighbor
 Eva Ionesco – Bettina, Mme Gaderian's Daughter
 Albert Delpy – Neighbour

Themes

Overview 

In his review of the film for The Regrettable Moment of Sincerity, Adam Lippe writes: "Many would attest that The Pianist is Polanski's most personal work, given the obvious Holocaust subject matter, but look beneath the surface, and when the window curtains are drawn aside, Polanski's The Tenant shines brightest as the work closest to his being."

Like the other two films in Polanski's Apartment Trilogy, The Tenant  blurs the line between psychological thriller and horror. It garnered critical comparisons to both its contemporaries Don't Look Now (1973) by Nicolas Roeg and Stanley Kubrick's The Shining (1980). Given its production design, photography, and the bizarre scenario of a group of neighbors that appear to be preying on a new tenant's life and conspiring against him for that purpose, it has also been compared to the black comedy film Delicatessen (1991). The narrative seems to suggest a house as the malevolent source to the sinister deeds of its inhabitants, and is set in a post-apocalyptic future where all animals have died and the people of a remote decaying house resort to eating each of the house's successive new janitors.

Kafka influence 

Many critics have noted The Tenants strong Kafkaesque theme, typified by an atmosphere that is absurdly over-burdened with anxiety, confusion, guilt, bleak humour, alienation, sexual frustration and paranoia. However, the film cannot be viewed as purely driven by a Kafkaesque motif because of the numerous references to Trelkovsky's delirium and heavy drinking. This allows for more than one interpretation.

Most of the action occurs within a claustrophobic environment where dark, ominous things occur without reason or explanation to a seemingly shy protagonist, whose perceived failings as a tenant are ruthlessly pursued by what Trelkovsky himself views as an increasingly cabalistic conspiracy. Minor infringements are treated as serious breaches of his tenancy agreement, and this apparent persecution escalates after he refuses to join his neighbours in a prejudiced campaign to oust a mother with a disabled child.

"The scheming plots over matters of extraordinary pettiness and inexplicable conspiracies that go on among the neighbours to gang up on others make The Tenant probably the first Kafkaesque horror film."

"Much effect is derived from the absurdity of the scenario where all Trelkovsky wants to do is not bother anyone, yet everything Trelkovsky does is seen as an imposition."

Critics have speculated that the film's Kafkaesque atmosphere must be in part a reflection of Polanski's own Jewish experiences within a predominantly anti-Semitic environment. Trelkovsky is viewed with suspicion by almost every other character simply because he has a foreign name. For example, when he tries to report a robbery to the French police he is treated sceptically and told that as a foreigner he should not make trouble. Both the director and the protagonist are outsiders who strive ineffectually for acceptance in what they see as a corrupt and mysterious world.

Vincent Canby wrote in The New York Times: "Trelkovsky exists. He inhabits his own body, but it's as if he had no lease on it, as if at any moment he could be dispossessed for having listened to the radio in his head after 10 P.M. People are always knocking on his walls."

According to Ulrich Behrens of Der Mieter (translated from the German):

Doomed cycle, loss of self, and social assimilation 

The Tenant has been referred to as a precursor to Kubrick's The Shining (1980), as another film where the lines between reality, madness, and the supernatural become increasingly blurry (the question usually asked with The Shining is "Ghosts or cabin fever?") as the protagonist finds himself doomed to cyclically repeat another person's nightmarish fall. Just like in The Shining, the audience is slowly brought to accept the supernatural by what at first seems a slow descent into madness, or vice versa: "The audience's predilection to accept a proto-supernatural explanation [...] becomes so pronounced that at Trelkovsky's break with sanity the viewer is encouraged to take a straightforward hallucination for a supernatural act."

In his book Polanski and Perception, Davide Caputo has called the fact that in the end, Trelkovsky defenestrates himself not once, but twice "a cruel reminder of the film's 'infinite loop'" of Trelkovsky becoming Mlle Choule meeting Trelkovsky shortly before dying in the hospital, a loop not unlike The Shining'''s explanation that Jack Torrance "has always been the Overlook's caretaker". Timothy Brayton of Antagony & Ecstasy likens this eternally looping cycle of The Tenant to the film's recurring Egyptian motifs:

Steve Biodrowski of Cinefantastique writes: "THE TENANT is short on typical horror movie action: there are no monsters, and there is little in the way of traditional suspense. That's because the film is not operating on the kind of fear that most horror films exploit: fear of death. Instead, THE TENANT's focus is on an equally disturbing fear: loss of identity." In his review of the film for The Regrettable Moment of Sincerity, Adam Lippe writes of Trelkovsky's surroundings sinisterly shaping him into an echo of the past: "Coming from a Nazi-occupied childhood, Polanski no doubt uses his character's identity crisis to illustrate society's ability to shape and mold the uniqueness of its members, whether they like it or not." Similarly, Dan Jardine of Apollo Guide writes: "Polanski seems to be studying how people, in our isolating world, increasingly mould themselves to their environment, sometimes to the point where their individual identity is absorbed into the world around them. The longer he is in the building, the more Trelkovsky begins to lose sight of where his internal sense of his 'self' ends, and his social identity begins."

Because of how little we get to know of Trelkovsky's life prior to his applying for the apartment and moving in, only to become an echo of former tenant Mademoiselle Choule because of his frail, almost inexistent personality's weak resistance to either her ghost or his bullying neighbors as if he has always been Mademoiselle Choule and always will be, the film has also been referred to as an early precursor to Fight Club (1999), a film where the final twist reveals it to be about a case of split personality.

 Isolation and claustrophobia 

A recurring theme with Polanski's films, but especially pronounced in The Tenant, is that of the protagonist as a silent, isolated observer in hiding. As Brogan Morris writes in Flickering Myth: "One of Roman Polanski's recurring motifs has always been the horror of the apartment space. It was as recently as his last film, Carnage, and in a crucial sequence of his masterful The Pianist: it's from an apartment window which Szpilman can do nothing but watch atrocities unfold outside. The fascination is there most obviously, though, in Polanski's 'Apartment Trilogy' [...]. And The Tenant, a blackly comedic meta-horror, is perhaps Polanski's ultimate use of the apartment as a claustrophobic, paranoid zone of terror."

{{blockquote|"The Tenant also makes an interesting film to read in term of Roman Polanski's own life – he, like the character he plays, is a Pole who went to live in Paris very shortly after the film was made. His other horror films – Repulsion, Rosemary's Baby – like The Tenant, see the apartment as a home of paranoia and madness. You could extend the analogy further and compare Repulsion, Rosemary's Baby and The Tenant to Polanski's The Pianist, where Adrien Brody's protagonist, a Jew living in Poland under Nazi occupation, is reduced to hiding a pitiful, starving existence hiding in cubbyholes and the bombed-out ruins of buildings where he cannot be sure whether the people he encounters are friend or foe or will betray him. Polanski himself grew up in the Krakow ghettos as a Jewish child under the Nazi occupation and survived by hiding in the countryside and with other families after his parents were taken to the concentration camps, so perhaps one can see the very personal nature of the recurrent themes of isolation, paranoia and the feeling that the apartment is an alien world in his work." |Richard Scheib (Moira: Science Fiction, Horror and Fantasy Film Review)| THE TENANT (Le Locataire)}}

Sexual deviance and repression 

Related to the aforementioned Kafkaesque guilt and the theme of identity loss, another theme that appears throughout the film is that of sexual deviance and Trelkovsky's increasing trespassing of traditional gender roles, as he more and more turns into an echo of former tenant Mademoiselle Choule.  German reviewer Andreas Staben writes: "And again, [Polanski] tells of sexual repression, and in Polanski's astounding, unpretentious performance, Trelkovsky's escape into the identity of Simone Choule appears as a consequential closure of all three films [of the Apartment Trilogy]. Other than was maybe the case still with Repulsion, there can be no talk whatsoever of a psycho-pathological case study anymore: Here, the individual is entirely wiped out and all that remains is the horror of facing a pure void."

Production notes
Although typically labelled as the third part of Polanski's so-called "Apartment Trilogy", this came about more by luck than by design. The film adaptation was originally to have been made by British director Jack Clayton, who was attached to the project around seven years before Polanski made it. According to Clayton's biographer Neil Sinyard, Clayton originally tried to make the film ca. 1969 for Universal Studios, from a script by Edward Albee, but this version never made it into production after the relationship between Albee and the studio soured. Paramount bought the rights on Clayton's advice in 1971. Clayton returned to the project in the mid-1970s, and a rough draft script by Christopher Hampton was written while Clayton was preparing The Great Gatsby. By the time Clayton had delivered Gatsby to Paramount in March 1974, he had learned from Robert Evans that Polanski was interested in the project and wanted to play the lead role. While Clayton was occupied preparing foreign language versions of Gatsby for the European market, Paramount studio head Barry Diller began negotiations with Polanski. Although Clayton later insisted that he was never specifically asked if he was still interested, and never said "no" to it, Diller wrongly assumed that Clayton had lost interest and transferred the project to Polanski, without asking Clayton. When he found out, Clayton called Diller in September 1974, expressing his dismay that Diller had given another director a film which (Clayton insisted) had been specifically purchased by the studio for him, and for doing so without consultation.

While the main character is clearly paranoid to some extent, the film does not entirely reveal whether everything takes place in his head or if the strange events happening around him exist at least partially, contrary to the previous entries in Polanski's "apartment trilogy."

Reception

The Tenant was poorly received on its release, with Roger Ebert declaring it "not merely bad – it's an embarrassment." Gene Siskel likewise called it a "psychological thriller without the thrills" and criticized the characters for lacking motivation. Since then the film has become a cult favorite. The film holds an 83% certified "fresh" rating on Rotten Tomatoes with 35 reviews and an average score of 7.8/10.

References

External links

French thriller films
French horror films
1976 films
1976 horror films
French satirical films
French supernatural horror films
Supernatural thriller films
French black comedy films
Films based on French novels
Films directed by Roman Polanski
1970s psychological thriller films
Films shot in Luxembourg
Paramount Pictures films
Films with screenplays by Gérard Brach
Films with screenplays by Roman Polanski
Films scored by Philippe Sarde
Films set in apartment buildings
Transgender-related films
English-language French films
Roland Topor
LGBT-related horror films
1976 LGBT-related films
1970s French films